Sandford Cliffs is a distinctive, mainly ice-free cliffs constituting the western limits of Peletier Plateau in the Queen Elizabeth Range. Named by the New Zealand Southern Party of the Commonwealth Trans-Antarctic Expedition (1956–58) for N. Sandford, IGY scientist at Scott Base in 1957.

Cliffs of Oates Land